Patrick S. McLain (born August 22, 1988 in Eau Claire, Wisconsin) is an American soccer goalkeeper.

Career

Early and collegiate
McLain attended California Polytechnic State University in San Luis Obispo, where he played soccer between 2007 and 2011. McLain earned second All-Big West second team spot his junior year after leading all conference goalkeepers with a program-record .835 save percentage and ranking second with 5.46 saves per match, third with five shut-outs and fourth with 71 saves

Chivas USA
McLain signed with MLS club Chivas USA in 2012, making his debut with the club on May 5, 2013. He had a brief loan spell in April 2013 with USL Pro club Los Angeles Blues.

Sacramento Republic 
McLain signed with United Soccer League club Sacramento Republic on February 17, 2015. He was named to the USL Team of the Week in week 13. On December 9, 2015 Republic FC declined the option on McLain for the 2016 season.

Chicago Fire 
McLain signed with MLS club Chicago Fire on January 18, 2016. On April 22, he was sent on short-term loan to the Fire's USL affiliate Saint Louis FC. The next day, he got the start in goal for Saint Louis against Sacramento Republic, keeping a clean sheet in a 1–0 victory over his old team.

McLain was released by Chicago at the end of their 2018 season.

Orlando City 
On December 16, 2016, McLain was selected by Orlando City in the second round of the 2016 Re-Entry Draft Stage 1.

References

External links
 
 Mustangs profile

1988 births
Living people
American soccer players
Cal Poly Mustangs men's soccer players
Portland Timbers U23s players
Orange County Blue Star players
Chivas USA players
Orange County SC players
Sacramento Republic FC players
Chicago Fire FC players
Saint Louis FC players
Minnesota United FC players
Association football goalkeepers
Soccer players from Wisconsin
USL League Two players
Major League Soccer players
USL Championship players
Sportspeople from Eau Claire, Wisconsin